The Chicago franchise (also called One Chicago) is a media franchise of American television programs created by Derek Haas and Michael Brandt, produced by Wolf Entertainment, and broadcast on NBC, all of which deal with different public services in Chicago, Illinois. The Chicago franchise has maintained strong ratings, leading primetime in total viewers, averaging nearly seven million viewers per show, between Chicago Fire, Chicago P.D., and Chicago Med.

Overview 

The Chicago franchise focuses on the professional and private lives of the firefighters, police officers, emergency medical personnel, and legal professionals who serve the city of Chicago. A recurring and unifying theme of the four shows is Molly's, a small bar owned by three firefighters which has been frequented by characters from all four shows. Dick Wolf has stated that most episodes in the franchise will end with a scene at Molly's, saying that "it's a great note on the end of every show that connects all the shows".

On September 26, 2018, NBC moved all three shows into consecutive time slots on Wednesday. On February 28, 2019, NBC renewed Chicago Fire, Chicago P.D., and Chicago Med for their eighth, seventh, and fifth seasons, respectively. All three Chicago shows will keep their respective time slots for the 2019–20 television season. On March 13, 2020, the production of season 5 of Med, 8 of Fire, and 7 of P.D. were suspended due to the COVID-19 pandemic.

Chicago Fire 

Chicago Fire follows the firefighters, paramedics, and rescue squad members of Chicago Fire Department Firehouse 51.

Chicago P.D. 

Chicago P.D. follows the uniformed patrol officers and detectives of the Chicago Police Department's 21st District, specifically the Intelligence Unit. The Chicago Fire episode "Let Her Go" serves as the backdoor pilot.

Chicago Med 

Chicago Med follows the doctors and nurses of Gaffney Chicago Medical Center. The Chicago Fire episode "I Am the Apocalypse" serves as the backdoor pilot.

Chicago Justice 

Chicago Justice follows the prosecutors and investigators at the Cook County State's Attorney's Office. The Chicago P.D. episode "Justice" serves as the backdoor pilot. The series was canceled after one season.

Series

Main cast

Crossovers 

The following table displays all the crossover storylines involving the Chicago series.

See also 
 FBI (franchise)
 Law & Order (franchise)

References

External links 
 #OneChicago Fan Hub

 
Mass media franchises introduced in 2012
Television franchises